The  Union Cycliste Internationale African Mountain Bike Championships (French : Championnat d'Afrique de VTT) is the highest echelon of Mountain Bike racing on the African continent. First held in 2007 at Windhoek, Namibia the event has been contested every year since. It is ruled and managed by the African Cycling Confederation. Over the years top riders from South Africa, Kenya, Lesotho, Malawi, Rwanda, Mauritius, Namibia, Botswana and Zimbabwe have attended this prestigious race. The championships are an Olympic qualifying event.

Editions

Men's summary

Elites

Under 23

Juniors

Women's summary

Elites

Under 23

Juniors

Team Cross-country

Cross-Country Marathon

Men

Women

Climbing

Men

Women

References

External links
 Official Webpage

Mountain biking in Africa
Mountain biking events
African championships
Recurring sporting events established in 2007